I'll Be Seeing You is a 1959 studio album by Jo Stafford. It was re-released in Japan in 1983.

Track listing

 "I Don't Want To Walk Without You"
 "It Could Happen To You" (Johnny Burke, Jimmy Van Heusen) 
 "I'll Walk Alone"
 "I'll Remember April"
 "We Mustn't Say Goodbye"
 "Yesterdays" (Jerome Kern, Otto Harbach) - 3:10
 No Love No Nothin'''
 "I'll Be Seeing You" (Sammy Fain, Irving Kahal) - 3:30
 "I Left My Heart At The Stage Door Canteen" (Irving Berlin) - 3:17
 I Fall In Love Too Easily You'll Never Know I Should Care''

Personnel
Jo Stafford sings on all tracks with an orchestra conducted by Paul Weston

References

1959 albums
Jo Stafford albums
Columbia Records albums
Albums arranged by Paul Weston